Helmsange is a town in the commune of Walferdange, in central Luxembourg. It has a population of 2,325 (in a 2011 census).

References

Walferdange
Towns in Luxembourg